Bebelis acuta is a species of beetle in the family Cerambycidae. It was described by Francis Polkinghorne Pascoe in 1875.

References

External links
 https://animaldiversity.org/accounts/Bebelis/classification/
 Collection of detailed scientific photographs of Bebelis Acuta

Bebelis
Beetles described in 1875
Taxa named by Francis Polkinghorne Pascoe